Dustin Brown and Antoine Hoang were the defending champions but only Brown chose to defend his title, partnering Andrea Vavassori. Brown lost in the quarterfinals to Ruben Bemelmans and Daniel Masur.

Roman Jebavý and Jonny O'Mara won the title after defeating Bemelmans and Masur 6–4, 7–5 in the final.

Seeds

Draw

References

External links
 Main draw

Challenger Eckental - Doubles
2021 Doubles